Sheep Creek is a  long tributary of the Bruneau River. In 2009,  of the creek were designated as wild by the Omnibus Public Land Management Act, which also created the Bruneau – Jarbidge Rivers Wilderness.

See also
List of rivers of Idaho
List of longest streams of Idaho
List of rivers of Nevada
List of National Wild and Scenic Rivers

References

Rivers of Owyhee County, Idaho
Rivers of Elko County, Nevada
Rivers of Idaho
Rivers of Nevada
Wild and Scenic Rivers of the United States